Text H of the rongorongo corpus, the larger of two tablets located in Santiago and therefore also known as the Great or Large Santiago tablet, is one of two dozen surviving rongorongo texts, and one of three recording the so-called "Grand Tradition".

Other names
H is the standard designation, from Barthel (1958). Fischer (1997) refers to it as RR9.

Location
Museo Nacional de Historia Natural, Santiago. Catalog # 5.498 (315). 

There are reproductions at the Musée de l'Homme, Paris; [https://uni-tuebingen.de/ETHNOLOGIE/museum/frameset.htm Institut für Völkerkunde], Tübingen (prior to 1989); Bishop Museum, Honolulu; American Museum of Natural History, New York; van Hoorebeeck Collection, Belgium; and in Steven Fischer's collection in Auckland.

Description

A fluted, delicately carved but fire-damaged tablet, 44.5 × 11.6 × 2.7 cm, of Pacific rosewood (Orliac 2005). The wood is bent, following the contours of the tree from which it was cut. The sides are beveled, perhaps to make a larger writing surface. 

A plugged hole at the top (recto) may have been used for hanging. On the left side of the recto, lines 8-12 have been burnt out; the damage continues onto the verso, taking out part of lines 1-2. There is a 10-cm gouge along the right of recto line 6 which Orliac (2003/2004:48-53) concluded was made by a fire stick in the making of a fire (image at right).  

Imbelloni (1951:99) was of the opinion that,
This tablet is one of the most finely incised among all those that one knows; each one of its figures has a harmoniously drawn contour; the incision is not deep, nor reveals itself on the surface by a furrow that is wide, but narrow, thread-like. (translation by Fischer)

Provenance
In 1870 Father Roussel gave tablets G and H to Captain Gana of the Chilean corvette O'Higgins. They remained in the custody of the Chilean navy in Valparaíso until they were sent to the newly established department of archeology at the Museo Nacional de Historia Natural.

Contents
The Large Santiago tablet holds a long 'chant cycle' (to use Fischer's words), versions of which is also found on the large and small St Petersburg tablets (P and Q). Shorter sequences are shared with other tablets: Hr7 with Aa2, Pr3, and Qr3; Hr2 with Qr2; and Hr4 with Qr4.

Text
There are twelve lines of glyphs on each side, with some 1,580 surviving glyphs out of a pre-fire total of approximately 1,770. The reading order of the parallel texts H, P, and Q is well established. 

Barthel

Fischer

Image gallery

References
 BARTHEL, Thomas S. 1958. Grundlagen zur Entzifferung der Osterinselschrift (Bases for the Decipherment of the Easter Island Script). Hamburg : Cram, de Gruyter.
 FISCHER, Steven Roger. 1997. RongoRongo, the Easter Island Script: History, Traditions, Texts. Oxford and N.Y.: Oxford University Press.
 IMBELLONI, José. 1951. "Las Tabletas Parlantes de Pascua: Monumentos de un Sistema Gráfico Indo-oceánico." Runa 4. 89-177.
 ORLIAC Catherine. 2003/2004. Manifestation de l'expression symbolique en Océanie : l'exemple des bois d'œuvre de l'Ile de Pâques (Manifestation of symbolic expression in Oceania: The example of the woodworking of Easter Island). Cahier V, Thème 6, Cultes, rites et religions, p. 48-53.
 ORLIAC, Catherine. 2005. "The Rongorongo Tablets from Easter Island: Botanical Identification and 14C Dating." Archaeology in Oceania 40.3.

External links
Barthel's coding of text H

Rongorongo inscriptions
Articles containing video clips